Swami is a 1977 Hindi Indian romance drama film directed by Basu Chatterjee and produced by Jaya Chakravarty (Hema Malini's mother). The film stars Shabana Azmi, Vikram, Girish Karnad and Utpal Dutt. Hema Malini and Dharmendra made guest appearances together in the film. The film's music is by Rajesh Roshan. The film was shot in location in Dahisar, Mumbai and the Dahisar River Banks.

Plot
"Saudamini" (Shabana Azmi) is a bright village girl with academic ambitions and an appetite for literature and philosophy. Her intellectual uncle (Utpal Dutt) indulges her brainy bent, encouraging her studies and patching up the petty ongoing conflicts with her mother, a pious widow whose only concern is to see Mini married, and quickly. Mini is in love with Narendra (Vikram), the Zamindar's son, a student in Calcutta who on his visits brings her Victorian literature, listens raptly to her discourse, and is bold enough to kiss her opportunistically when caught together in a rainstorm. However circumstances conspire against Mini and Narendra, and Mini finds herself married against her wishes to Ghanshyam (Girish Karnad) a wheat trader from a neighboring village. While her husband treats her with a patience which she finds perplexing, Mini struggles to become accustomed to life in her new home. And then Narendra returns. How does she resolve her dilemma?

Cast 

 Shabana Azmi as Saudamini ''Mini''
 Girish Karnad as Ghanshyam
 Utpal Dutt as Mini's uncle
 Vikram Makandar as Narendra ''Naren''
 Sudha Shivpuri as Mini's mother
 Shashikala as Ghanshyam's step-mother 
 Preeti Ganguly as Charu Devi
 Hema Malini as Nautanki dancer (special appearance)
 Dharmendra as Nautaki dancer (special appearance)
 Dheeraj Kumar as Nikhil
 Ritu Kamal as Shobha
 Deepak Kumar as Deepak, Charu's prospective groom
 Vinita Dutt as Mukta
 Kedarnath Saigal as Mukhiya ji
 Amol Sen as Jagannath - sarvant in Ghanshyam's house
 Kartik Dutt as Ramu

Soundtrack
The music is by Rajesh Roshan, who received a Filmfare nomination for composing memorable numbers like Kishore Kumar's "Yaadon Mein Woh", Yesudas's "Kaa Karoon Sajni" and Lata Mangeshkar's "Pal Bhar Mein Yeh Kya Ho Gaya".

Track list

Awards
25th Filmfare Awards:

Won

 Best Director – Basu Chatterjee
 Best Actress – Shabana Azmi
 Best Story – Sarat Chandra Chattopadhyay

Nominated

 Best Film – Jayasarathy Combine
 Best Music Director – Rajesh Roshan
 Best Male Playback Singer – K.J. Yesudas for "Aaye Na Balam"

References

External links
Review at Filmi Geek
 

1977 films
1970s Hindi-language films
Films directed by Basu Chatterjee
Films scored by Rajesh Roshan
Films based on works by Sarat Chandra Chattopadhyay
Films based on Indian novels
Best Popular Film Providing Wholesome Entertainment National Film Award winners